Truly Blessed is the eleventh studio album by R&B singer Teddy Pendergrass, released in March 1991 on the Elektra label. Four tracks were produced by Pendergrass, with four of the tracks produced by him and Terry Price, and the remaining three produced by Derek Nakamoto and Craig Burbidge.

Truly Blessed peaked at #49 on the Billboard 200 and #4 on the R&B chart. It spawned Pendergrass' third and last R&B chart-topping single in "It Should've Been You", and also contained two further top 40 R&B singles.

Track listing

Notes
  denotes an additional producer
  denotes a co-producer

Personnel
 Teddy Pendergrass - lead vocals
 Phyllis Yvonne, Marva King, Mark Philosit, Michelle Kornegay, Annette Hardeman, Jacqueline Gregory, Paula Holloway, Charlene Holloway, Minnie Curry, Terry Price, Darryl Phinnessee, Dorian Holley, Jim Gilstrap, Julia Tiltman Waters, Maxine Waters, Oren Waters, Wendy Fraser, Rosalind Keel, Fred White, Phyllis St James, Portia Griffin, Joey Diggs, Solomon Henderson Jr., Keith Jones, Sheila Lakin, Bridgent Potts, Ron Monroe, John Kee, Andrea Deese, Clarissa Rhodes, Jeanette Taylor - backing vocals
 Randy Bowland, Paul Jackson Jr., Darien Daughtry, David Gardner, Tim Pierce, Andre Storey, Richard Tucker - guitar
 Carlos Vega, Luis Conte, Steve Hopkins, Denny Fongheiser, Jim Carter - drums, percussion
 Freddy Washington, Abraham Laboriel, Chuckii Booker - bass guitar
 Patrick Moten - acoustic piano
 Derek Nakamoto, Curt Dowd, Bryan Williams, Kevin Ashkins - keyboards
 Pamela Williams - saxophone
 Gerald Albright - tenor saxophone
 Clay Jenkins, Charlie Davis, Steve Holyman, Henry McMillan Jr., Andrew Lamb, Darnell Robinson, Louis Taylor, Marc Johnson - horns
 June Kuramoto - koto
 Basil Fung - electric stick
 Jim Salamone, Chilli "E" - drum programming

Charts

Weekly charts

Year-end charts

References

1991 albums
Teddy Pendergrass albums
Elektra Records albums